The First Methodist Episcopal Church in Vermillion, South Dakota is a historic church at 14-16 North Dakota Street.  It has also been known as First United Methodist Church.  It was built during 1927-29 and was added to the National Register in 2004.

It was deemed significant "as a well preserved example of a Late Gothic Revival style and a sub-type termed castellated or parapeted. It is an excellent example of this style in South Dakota."

References

Methodist churches in South Dakota
Churches on the National Register of Historic Places in South Dakota
Gothic Revival church buildings in South Dakota
Churches completed in 1929
Churches in Clay County, South Dakota
National Register of Historic Places in Clay County, South Dakota
Buildings and structures in Vermillion, South Dakota